The 2007 FC Dallas season was the eleventh season of the Major League Soccer team. During the offseason, long-time owner and partial founder of the MLS Lamar Hunt died. His son, Clark Hunt, took control of the team. The team was invite to participate in the first SuperLiga tournament. The team did not make it out of the Group stage.

Final standings

Regular season

Playoffs

Western Conference semifinals

U.S. Open Cup

SuperLiga

Group Round

External links
 Season statistics

2007
Dallas
FC Dallas